Shane Pahukoa (born November 25, 1970) is a former American football safety who played two seasons in the National Football League for the New Orleans Saints.  He played college football at the University of Washington and was not drafted.

College
Pahukoa was a four-year letterman for Washington from 1989 to 1992 and team captain. Shane won 3 PAC-10 Championships and 1 National Championship while at The University of Washington. Pahukoa was named to the First Team All-Pac 10 Academic team in 1990. He was also selected 2nd Team All-Pac-10 free safety in 1991 and 1992.

New Orleans Saints
Pahukoa led the New Orleans Saints in Special Team tackles in 1995 with 20 tackles. Against the New England Patriots, Pahukoa racked up 12 tackles and intercepted Drew Bledsoe twice.

References

External links
  Husky Legend: Shane Pahukoa
 True Grit : Huskies' Shane Pahukoa, a Burn Victim as a Child, Has Always Been Tough

1970 births
Living people
American football safeties
New Orleans Saints players
Washington Huskies football players
Sportspeople from Vancouver, Washington
People from Marysville, Washington
Players of American football from Washington (state)